The Pontifical Catholic University of Puerto Rico (Pontificia Universidad Católica de Puerto Rico) is a private Roman Catholic university with its main campus in Ponce, Puerto Rico. It provides courses leading to Bachelor's, Master's and Doctorate degrees in education, business administration, the sciences, and arts and humanities. It also has campuses in Arecibo and Mayagüez, as well as a satellite extension in Coamo. It is also home to a School of Law and a School of Architecture. The university also founded a medical school, Escuela de Medicina de Ponce, in 1977, but in 1980 became an independent entity that eventually became the Ponce Health Sciences University.

The Pontifical Catholic University of Puerto Rico was founded in 1948 as Universidad Católica de Santa Maria, but its name was changed to Universidad Católica de Puerto Rico with the graduation of its first class in 1950. On 25 January 1991, the name was changed again to its current name, after Pope John Paul II bestowed the title of pontifical on the university.

History
The university was founded in spring of 1948 by James E. McManus, C.S.S.R., Bishop of the Diocese of Ponce, and James Peter Davis, Bishop of the Diocese of San Juan. It was founded as the Catholic University of Santa Maria. "The name Santa Maria was chosen to honor the Mother of God and to implore her protection and help."  Its first president was Monseñor Vicente Murga. The original campus consisted of a few classrooms provided by the Capuchin Friars (OFM) and the Sisters of Saint Joseph, catholic clergymen and nuns, respectively, in the Colegio San Conrado in Ponce, a catholic primary educational school. During 1949, the university acquired  from the Government of Puerto Rico (administered by Autoridad de Tierras). This plot of land was located south of the city center proper and was, at the time, part of the Ingenio La Reparada sugar cane plantation, and being used to feed Central Mercedita sugar mill. The University has been accredited by the Middle States Association of Colleges and Schools since 1953.

Presidents
 Jorge Iván Vélez Arocho (2010–present)
 Marcelina Velez de Santiago (2006 - 2010)
 Jose Alberto Morales (2001 - 2006)
 Tossello Giangiacono (1984 - 2001)
 Jaime B. Fuster (1981 - 1984)
 Francisco Carreras (1969 - 1981)
 Theodore McCarrick (1965 - 1969)
 John F. Mueller (1961 - 1965)
 Thomas Stanley (1956 - 1961)
 William Ferree (1953 - 1956)
 Vicente Murga (1948 - 1953)

Schools
In 1961, the university started the School of Law providing graduate law studies and student exchange programs with other law schools in the United States and in Spain. The school has been host to famous and respected Puerto Rican law professors, including former Puerto Rico governor Rafael Hernández Colón.

In 1976, the university started the School of Medicine as a graduate medical education program, which, when reorganized, became an independent private institution now known as the Ponce Health Sciences University.

In 2009, the university opened a School of Architecture.

In 2011, the university announced it was engaging in a $20 million expansion plan that would result in the creation of three new schools over a ten-year period. The three new schools were reported to be a School of Graphical Design, a School of Fashion, and a School of Cinematic Arts.

Campuses
Aside from its main campus in Ponce, specifically on barrio Canas Urbano, on Avenida Las Americas (PR-163), the university has two additional campuses: the Pontifical Catholic University of Puerto Rico at Arecibo in Arecibo and the Pontifical Catholic University of Puerto Rico at Mayagüez in Mayagüez. It also has a satellite extension in Coamo. The Pontifical Catholic University of Puerto Rico School of Architecture is also a separate campus and is located across from Plaza Las Delicias at the historic Forteza Building in downtown Ponce.

Student life

Notable alumni
 Imna Arroyo
 Javier Culson
 Juan H. Cintrón García
 Juan Miguel Betancourt
 Julio Brady 
 Lymari Nadal 
 Rafael Cordero Santiago
 Luisa R. Seijo Maldonado
 Wichie Torres

See also

 Museo de Arqueología de la Pontificia Universidad Católica de Puerto Rico
 Pontifical Catholic University of Puerto Rico School of Law
 Ponce School of Medicine
 Pontifical Catholic University of Puerto Rico at Mayagüez
 Pontifical Catholic University of Puerto Rico School of Architecture
 Coro de la Pontificia Universidad Católica de Puerto Rico

References

External links
 

 
Universities and colleges in Puerto Rico
Pontifical universities
Catholic universities and colleges in Puerto Rico
Educational institutions established in 1948
Liga Atletica Interuniversitaria de Puerto Rico
Universities and colleges in Ponce, Puerto Rico
1948 establishments in Puerto Rico
Education in Ponce, Puerto Rico